The Jesse Ventura Story is a 1999 American biographical film directed by David Jackson and written by Patricia Jones and Donald Reiker. The film stars Nils Allen Stewart, Nancy Anne Sakovich, Thomas Brandise, Christopher Bondy, Nola Augustson and Jef Mallory. The film premiered on NBC on May 23, 1999.

Plot

Cast  
Nils Allen Stewart as Jesse Ventura
Nancy Anne Sakovich as Terry Ventura
Thomas Brandise as Teen Jesse Ventura
Christopher Bondy as George Janos
Nola Augustson as Bernice Janos
Jef Mallory as Teen Tyrell
Jonathan Potts as Dean
Elias Zarou as Chaney
Bobby Johnston as Captain Nice
Dwight McFee as Norm Coleman
David Huband as Skip Humphrey
Phillip Jarrett as Non Com
Michael Ruperco		
Kevin Rushton as Billy Graham
Tommy Dorrian
Chris Kanyon as Kanyon / Mortis

References

External links
 

1999 films
1999 television films
1990s English-language films
1990s biographical films
American biographical films
Davis Entertainment films
NBC network original films
Films directed by David Jackson (director)
Jesse Ventura
1990s American films